Scopula candidaria  is a moth of the family Geometridae. It was described by Warren in 1902. It is found in Kenya, the Democratic Republic of Congo and Uganda.

Taxonomy
Scopula candidaria is a junior secondary homonym of Acidalia candidaria (Packard, 1873) requiring a replacement name.

References

Moths described in 1902
candidaria
Moths of Africa
Taxa named by William Warren (entomologist)